The Pollino (Italian: Massiccio del Pollino) is a massif in the southern Apennines, on the border between Basilicata and Calabria, southern Italy. It became part of the Pollino National Park in 1992. The main peaks include Monte Pollino (2,248 m) and the massif's high point, Serra Dolcedorme (2,267 m), which overlooks the plain of Sibari.

Geology

Formed from limestone, the Pollino is the highest area in the range, and erosion of the limestone, especially on the Calabrian side, has created numerous grottoes, such as the Romito grottoes, in which Palaeolithic petroglyphs have been found. Canyons have also been carved into the limestone, such as the canyon created by the Raganello stream.

Wildlife

The Pollino is home to a flourishing fauna and flora. Woods dominated by chestnut, beech and the rare Bosnian pine, which is the park's symbol, cover especially the highest peaks; animal species include the Italian wolf, eagle owl, roe deer and the rare golden eagle.

See also
 Calabrian wine
 List of European ultra prominent peaks
 List of Italian regions by highest point

References

External links
 Viaggiare nel pollino Info, accommodation, walking, guide, hiking
 Progetto Pollino Sinkholes and climate analysis
 "Serra Dolcedorme, Italy" on Peakbagger

Apennine Mountains
Mountains of Calabria
Mountains of Basilicata
Mountain ranges of Italy
Highest points of Italian regions
Two-thousanders of Italy